The  Foster Ranch House, near Chance, South Dakota, was built in 1918.  It was listed on the National Register of Historic Places in 1987.

It was deemed "a fine example of a concrete block house that was popularized by William A. Radford."

References

Houses on the National Register of Historic Places in South Dakota
Houses completed in 1918
Perkins County, South Dakota